Along the Oregon Trail is a 1947 American Western film directed by R. G. Springsteen and written by Earle Snell. The film stars Monte Hale, Lorna Gray, Clayton Moore, Roy Barcroft, Max Terhune and Will Wright. The film was released on August 30, 1947, by Republic Pictures.

Plot

Cast   
 Monte Hale as Monte Hale
 Lorna Gray as Sally Dunn 
 Clayton Moore as Gregg Thurston
 Roy Barcroft as Jake Stoner
 Max Terhune as Max Terhune
 Will Wright as Jim Bridger
 Wade Crosby as Blacksmith Tom
 LeRoy Mason as Lieutenant John Fremont
 Tom London as Wagon Boss
 Forrest Taylor as Kit Carson
 Foy Willing as Guitar Player / Singer
 Riders of the Purple Sage as Musicians

References

External links 
 

1947 films
American Western (genre) films
1947 Western (genre) films
Republic Pictures films
Films directed by R. G. Springsteen
Trucolor films
1940s English-language films
1940s American films